Central i-City is a shopping mall located in i-City, Shah Alam, Selangor, Malaysia. The mall is a joint-venture project between Thailand’s largest retail property developer Central Pattana PCL (CPN), with a 60 per cent stake, and i-City Properties Sdn Bhd (ICP), an affiliate of i-Berhad that holds 40 per cent. Central i-City is CPN's first international mall.

As of November 2019, the mall is the largest in Shah Alam in terms of floor area and recorded footfall of about 800,000 a month. The mall also houses the largest Samsung Onyx LED cinema screen in Southeast Asia.

History
The construction of the shopping mall started in January 2016, initially named CentralPlaza@i-City. The mall spans 1.5 million sq ft of gross floor area with gross development value (GDV) of RM 850 million. The mall was expected to be opened in August 2018.

The mall had its soft opening on 23 March 2019 and was officially opened by the Sultan of Selangor, HRH Sultan Sharafuddin Idris Shah on 15 June 2019.

Tenants

Anchor Tenants
Sogo Department Store
TGV Cinemas
Village Grocer

Junior Tenants
Ace Hardware
ALL IT Hypermarket
BRANDS OUTLET
FOOD EMPIRE
Go Fit
Manekineko Malaysia
PADINI CONCEPT STORE
Palace 8 Restaurant
POPULAR
Sports Direct
TBM
The Parenthood
UNIQLO

Tenants list
Among the tenants in the mall are:
7 ELEVEN
4 Fingers Crispy Chicken
Aafiyat Store
Absolute Thai
A&W Restaurants
A LOOK Eyewear
Adidas
Al Ikhsan SPORTS
annur
ANTA
APEXCHANGE
APT Salon
ASUS & Acer
AWG Fine Watches
Baby Bull
babyshop
BANANA BRO
BAR.B.Q PLAZA
Baskin-Robbins
Bath & Body Works
BB.Q Chicken
BBQ Town Restaurant 
BLACK CANYON
Bluunis
Boat Noodle
BOKITTA
BONIA
BOOST Juice 
BOROFONE by AMG Gadget
Bread History
Bread Talk
BUBBLEBEE
Bungkus Kaw Kaw
BURGER KING
CALA QISYA
CARING PHARMACY
CARS International
Celcom
Café Amazon
Chapayom
Cha Tra Mue
CELMONZE the Signature
Chatime
Carl´s Jr
Charles & Keith
Chicky Chicken
Chicken Plus & Mr Dakaglbi
Chong Kok Kopitiam
City Farm
Cold Stone Creamery
Common Sense
Container Kebab
Cotton On
Cha Cha Go
CHUN Korean Hot Dogs
Cutiecle The Nail Experts
Coway & CUCKOO
Daily Fruity
Dave's Deli
David Locksmith
Dockers
digi Store Express
dip n dip Chocolate Cafe
Dubu Yo
Dunkin Donuts
EDIBEE
E.D Eight Days Salon
EIGHTY ONE 
ELFI Jewellery
Empire Sushi
ETUDE House
Extreme
Family Mart
Famous Amos
FELANCY
Fitness Concept
F Timber
Focus Point
Foot Locker
Gamers Hideout
Gigi Coffee
GINTELL
Giordano
Godiva
Go Noodle House
Guardian
Hot Pot Town Restaurant
HLA
Hamley´s
Heritage Nyonya Cuisine
Himalaya
HONOR
Hot & Roll
HP
Haidilao Hot Pot
HUAWEI
HUMMER
Indo Bowl
Infinite Watch & Co.
I Love Yoo
Innisfree
IQOS
Italiannies 
John Henry
Johnny´s Restaurant
Jom Laksa
Juice Works
Jungle House
Jelly Bunny
Kee Nguyễn Vietnam's Finest Coffee
KFC
Kickers
Kidzoona
Kiehl´s
KOI The
Koong Woh Tong
KURO Teppanyaki DIY
Kyochon 1991
LAC
LANEIGE
Lazo Diamond
Levi´s
Leko Leko
Little Nyonya Cafe
llaollao
Low Sugar Lab
LYN
Machines
Max Fashion
Mail Boxes ETC
Max City
Maxis
Mee Tarik Warisan Asli
Mi Store
Mj Jewellery
Molten Chocolate Cafe
Moms House
MONTIGO
Moto Guzzi
MR D.I.Y
MR TOY
Myeong Dong Toppokki
My Beaute Village
my Eureka Snack Bar
Nando´s
Navy & Navy
New ERA
New Balance
Next Kids
OGAWA
OO Bistro
ONEXOX
Oppa Korean Hot Dog
Oppo
OSIM
OWL
PALO
Party Wonderland
Pepper Lunch
Pet Lovers Centre
Pizza Hut Malaysia
Polaris 
Pierre Cardin
PONEY
Puzzle Planet
Qaira Hajib
Quick Cut
Rollney
RotiBoy 
Sangkaya
Squid Boy
Seoul Garden
Serta 
Siti Khadijah
Sangkaya
Sasa
Scholl
SD Club
Seen
Secret Recipe
Sepiring
Saravanaa Bhavan
Skechers
Shihlin Taiwan Street Snacks
Shoebox
SOFEAROSE
Sorella
Sopoong
Sox World
Squid Boy
STARBUCKS
STEVE MADDEN
Street Churros
Sushi Jiro
Sushi King
Swarovski
Sushi Zanmai
Sukiya
Samsung Express Service Center
Sports Direct
TARE
TGI Fridays
The Brew Crew
The Chicken Rice Shop
The Body Shop
The Face Shop
TICINO Paris
Typo
The Loaf Bakery & Cafe
The Nasi Lemak Co
Tealive
Thai Syok
Teh Tarik Place
TODAK
Today Fix
TOMAZ
TOMEI
Timberland
Tiger Sugar
Travel for All
Tiny Button
Trudy & Teddy
Thai Odyssey
The Sneaker Street
Tudung People
U Mobile
Under Armour
Universal Traveller
VANS
Vanilla Mille Crepe
Victoria´s Secret
Vivo
VINSTELLA
VELVET Threading & Waxing Specialist
Victoria Facelift
Waffin
Waroong
Whoosh
Wah Chan
World of Watches II
W´s Hainam Corner
Watsons Malaysia
XIXILI
Yole Yogurt
Young Hearts & Young Curves
YUBISO
ZING
ZOK Noodle House

Access

Rail
The mall will be connected to the  Seksyen 7 Shah Alam LRT station once the LRT line is completed in 2024. The SmartSelangor MBSA bus route  is also provided for mall customers travelling to and from the  Padang Jawa KTM station, UiTM Shah Alam campus and Seksyen 17 Bus Terminal.

Road
The mall is accessible via Federal Route 2Kuala Lumpur–Port Klang highway and Federal Route 20 North Klang Straits Bypass.

References

Shopping malls in Selangor
Shopping malls established in 2019